The Institute for Economic Studies - Europe (IES) is a Paris-based non-profit organization created in 1989. IES faculty include Tibor Machan, Douglass Rasmussen, Tom G. Palmer, Joseph Pini, Carlo Lottieri, Stephen Davies, Colin Ganley, Boudewijn Bouckaert, Randy Barnett, and Pierre Garello.

Since 1989 IES-Europe is organizing summer seminars meant to explore the ideas of classical liberalism through economics, philosophy, law, history and political science. Each year the institute is gathering 30 to 40 students in countries such as Bulgaria, Germany, Georgia and Romania. Furthermore, a well-known annual event organized by IES is the Summer University in Aix-en-Provence, France, where a couple of hundreds of IES alumni and liberty lovers gather to discuss the challenges existing in their own countries with the purpose of finding solutions based on private property, individual rights and liberty.

External links
 official web site

Libertarianism in France
Libertarian think tanks
Europe
Political and economic think tanks based in France
Organizations based in Paris